Little Laureate is an American company that produces developmental, multimedia products for small children and their caregivers. It was founded in 2001 by Heather Maclean and Monica Gibson. Little Laureate products are distributed in the United States, Canada, Korea and Hong Kong.

Premise
Little Laureate's first products were DVD programs that promote world culture, conservation and creativity using works of art, architecture and animals with classical music and world music. The series features animation, live footage, and a process the company has dubbed "Symphonic Art Animation," wherein onscreen visuals are animated in time to classical music. The series is hosted by an animated star named "Star."

Little Laureate products suggest that they are meant to be watched with an adult and provide adult-only special features to promote that concept. Every piece of art onscreen is identified by a caption, like music videos, that cite the name of the work and its artist. The DVD includes an onscreen written guide called "The Crawl" that resembles VH1's Pop-up Video, and is designed to give information, inspiration and humor to adult viewers.

Little Laureate was the first toddler home media product optimized for high-definition television.

Little Laureate was the first children's series to license a song from the African Children's Choir; "Bolingo" appears on My World Safari.

Titles
 My World Gallery
 My World Adventure
 My World Colors
 My World Safari
 For the Love of Art (re-issued as "My World Gallery")
 For the Love of World Travel (re-issued as "My World Adventure")

Awards

 2004: "Best Video Series of All Time," Parents magazine
 2004: "Video of the Year," Parenting magazine
 2007: "Media of the Year," Creative Child magazine
 "Gold Award," National Association of Parenting Publications
 "Top 10 Best Audio Products," Dr. Toy
 "Top 100 Best Products," Dr. Toy

References

External links
Little Laureate official website
Little Laureate, Internet Movie Database

Infancy
Early childhood education in the United States
Toy companies of the United States